Havredal is a small Danish village with a population of 134 (as of 1 January 2012).

References

Villages in Denmark
Populated places established in 1759
Populated places in Central Denmark Region
Viborg Municipality